PIANZEA (Pacific Islands, Australia and New Zealand Electoral Administrators’ Network) is an organisation of electoral administrators in Oceania.

Network members include America Samoa, Australia, Cook Islands, Fiji, French Polynesia, Guam, Kiribati, Federated States of Micronesia, New Zealand, New Caledonia, Niue, Palau, Papua New Guinea, Samoa, Solomon Islands, Tonga, Vanuatu and Wallis and Futuna.

External links
Description
PIANZEA Official Website

Political organizations based in Oceania
Election and voting-related organizations